LA Galaxy, also known as the Los Angeles Galaxy, are an American professional soccer club based in the Los Angeles metropolitan area. The Galaxy competes in Major League Soccer (MLS), as a member of the Western Conference. The club began play in 1996 as one of the league's 10 charter members.

The Galaxy were founded in 1994 and are owned by Anschutz Entertainment Group (also owners of 50% of the Los Angeles Kings, as well as an interest in the Los Angeles Lakers). In their early years, the club played its home games at the Rose Bowl in Pasadena, California. Since 2003, they have played at Dignity Health Sports Park in Carson, California. The team holds a rivalry with the San Jose Earthquakes in the California Clásico and used to play the SuperClasico against city rivals Chivas USA before that team folded in 2014. Following the league's dissolution of Chivas USA, a new expansion team, Los Angeles Football Club (LAFC), was formed in 2014 and began play in 2018.  The new L.A. rivalry was dubbed "El Tráfico."

The franchise is one of Major League Soccer's most successful teams, with a record five MLS Cups and four additional appearances in the final, and won the Western Conference regular-season title eight times, four Supporters' Shields, two U.S. Open Cups, and one CONCACAF Champions' Cup title. In 2017, the club added the dubious MLS Wooden Spoon to its trophy case for finishing at the bottom of the MLS table.

In 2007, the club made international headlines with the signing of English player David Beckham from Real Madrid, the most high-profile transaction with Major League Soccer to that point. The club has fielded other high-profile international players including Zlatan Ibrahimović, Robbie Keane, Luis Hernández, Giovani dos Santos, Mauricio Cienfuegos, Jonathan dos Santos, Jorge Campos, Steven Gerrard, Ashley Cole, Javier Hernández, and American Landon Donovan, who is the all-time leading scorer for the club. In 2019, Forbes estimated the club is the second most valuable in the league, worth about $480 million.

History

Early years (1996–2000) 

LA Galaxy is one of the 10 founding clubs in Major League Soccer. The name "Galaxy" was derived from Los Angeles being home to the "stars" of Hollywood. The team began competing in the first season of the then-new league, which took place in 1996.

In the inaugural season, the Galaxy finished first in the Western Conference and contested the first MLS Cup final, finishing as runners-up to D.C. United. In 1997, they started 1–7, but went 15–9 for the rest of the season to qualify for the playoffs. The Galaxy ended up second in their conference, losing to the Dallas Burn. In 1998, the Galaxy left off on a streak, eventually finishing 24–8. The Galaxy defeated the Dallas Burn, 9–3 on aggregate. They lost in the semi-final to the Chicago Fire, 2–1 on aggregate.

The Galaxy again finished first in the Western Conference in 1999, with a final record of 20–12, with a win in the CONCACAF Champions' Cup, but lost to D.C. United again 2–0. The 2000 season had the Galaxy in second in the Western Division, at 14–10–8. Despite this, they lost to the Kansas City Wizards after a tied aggregate and a sudden-death game. Los Angeles won the CONCACAF Champions' Cup that same year, one of two American clubs to win the tournament.

2001 was another successful year for Los Angeles, winning the Open Cup and scoring 1,000 all-time points, and with Cobi Jones scoring the 300th goal, but again they fell short by being defeated by Landon Donovan and the San Jose Earthquakes. Again the club clinched first in the Western Conference with a 16–9–3 record, their fifth time being first. Los Angeles were to take part in FIFA's Club World Cup as Concacaf champions from the previous year, but the tournament was cancelled that year.

First MLS Cup (2002) 
In 2002, the Galaxy won their first MLS Cup in the club's fourth appearance by defeating the New England Revolution 1–0. In 2003, the Galaxy finished fourth playing more away games due to stadium construction, with the possible existing obstacles, the team finished 9–12–9. The Galaxy bounced back by gaining second with an 11–9–10 record. They lost to the Wizards in the final, 0–2.

In 2005, the Galaxy acquired Landon Donovan from San Jose. The franchise won the Open Cup again ending with a record of 13–13–6. Having qualified for the playoffs for the 2005 season, The Galaxy has been the only team to appear in the playoffs in all of the league's first ten seasons. They won the 2005 MLS Cup, defeating the New England Revolution in extra time, 1–0.

The 2006 season began on March 16 with the sudden death of Doug Hamilton, the team's 43-year-old general manager, who suffered a heart attack on board a plane carrying the team back from Costa Rica where they had played Saprissa in the CONCACAF Champions' Cup. The team finished fifth in the Western Conference, eliminating them from playoff contention for the first time since the league's inception. Midway through the season, Steve Sampson was sacked as head coach, replaced by Frank Yallop. The team managed to make a deep run to the U.S. Open Cup final, but lost 3–1 against the Chicago Fire.

Beckham era (2007–2012) 

In March 2007, Herbalife signed a five-year deal with the Galaxy, worth between $4–5 million a year, to be the club's primary shirt sponsor. Four months later, the club signed David Beckham from Real Madrid. His debut was made at Home Depot Center before a record crowd of nearly 35,000, including many celebrities, coming on in the 78th minute in a 1–0 loss to Chelsea in a match during the World Series of Football tournament. The match brought unprecedented TV coverage from ESPN, who used 19 cameras to cover it, including one trained only on Beckham, even when he was on the bench. In that season's SuperLiga, LA reached the final but lost to Mexican side Pachuca on penalties after extra time. LA nearly made the end-of-season play-offs, but were eliminated following a 1–0 loss to the Chicago Fire. In the off-season, Cobi Jones retired and, amidst rumors that he was going to be sacked, Yallop resigned as head coach following a friendly match at Home Depot Center. The San Jose Earthquakes bought out his contract and offered a third round draft pick to the Galaxy as compensation to hire Yallop as their new head coach. Yallop was replaced at LA by Ruud Gullit, who signed a three-year contract with the club, making him the highest paid coach in MLS history. Cobi Jones returned as assistant coach. LA went on a promotional tour of Australia and New Zealand, setting attendance records in both countries. 80,295 people showed up at Stadium Australia for the match between Sydney FC and LA Galaxy, which the home side won 5–3. They also played a tour of Asia, and competed in the inaugural Pan-Pacific Championship in Honolulu, finishing third after beating Sydney 2–1 in the third-place match.

In the 2008 MLS season, LA went on a seven-game winless streak that saw them drop from first place in the Western Conference to outside playoff contention, prompting the resignation of manager Ruud Gullit and firing of general manager Alexi Lalas. Gullit was replaced by Bruce Arena, who was unable to lead LA into a play-off spot, for the third-straight season.

In the following off-season, both club captain David Beckham and vice-captain Landon Donovan were involved in loan deals with European clubs until the beginning of the new MLS season; Beckham to Milan in Italy and Donovan to German club Bayern Munich. Donovan was seeking a permanent transfer to Munich, while Beckham was expected to return to LA in March, prior to the 2009 season. Beckham went on to seek a permanent transfer to Milan in a bid to sustain his England career through the 2010 World Cup, and Milan made a bid for the player that was rejected by LA. One day before his loan deal was to expire, Milan and LA reached an agreement to allow Beckham to stay in Italy until the conclusion of the Rossoneri's season in June, before returning to LA in July. Donovan was not offered a contract by Bayern, and returned to the U.S. in time for the beginning of the 2009 MLS season. In the book The Beckham Experiment by Grant Wahl, Donovan openly criticized Beckham for his handling of the loan deals. Beckham and Donovan would later reconcile upon Beckham's return to LA in July.

LA finished the 2009 season top of the Western Conference and runners-up in the MLS Supporters' Shield, qualifying for the 2009 MLS Cup. They reached the final by beating Chivas USA 3–2 on aggregate in the quarter-final, and Houston Dynamo 2–0, after extra time, in the semi-final. In the final they drew 1–1 with Real Salt Lake at Qwest Field in Seattle, but lost 5–4 on penalties. By reaching the final, they qualified for the 2010–11 CONCACAF Champions League Preliminary Round.

After the 2009 success, both Donovan and Beckham again went out on second loan spells. Donovan went to Everton while Beckham returned to Milan, where he ruptured his Achilles tendon and therefore missed his chance at playing in the World Cup for England and subsequently missing most of the Galaxy's 2010 season.

In 2010, the Galaxy stayed at the top of the table and won the Supporters' Shield, the first time MLS played a balanced schedule. They then lost to FC Dallas in the Western Conference Final, one game away from making another appearance at MLS Cup.

In 2011, a year in which they added the Republic of Ireland's all-time leading goalscorer Robbie Keane, they won their fourth Supporters' Shield with two games remaining, becoming the third-straight team to win consecutive Shields while amassing the second-best points total in MLS history. They followed this up with their third MLS Cup, defeating the Houston Dynamo 1–0 in the final. The 2011 MLS Cup was the Galaxy's first MLS Cup Victory in regulation. The 2002 and the 2005 MLS Cup wins were won in overtime.

In January 2012, after much speculation, Beckham signed a new two-year deal with LA to secure his short-term future at the club. Despite the new contract, Beckham confirmed in November 2012 that he would be leaving the Galaxy at the end of the 2012 MLS season. On December 1, 2012, the Galaxy won their second-straight MLS Cup victory over the Houston Dynamo, 3–1. Galaxy defender Omar Gonzalez won the MLS MVP trophy, heading in the 1–1 equalizer in the 60th minute. That goal was quickly followed by a Donovan penalty kick, and Keane sealed the game with another penalty kick in stoppage time. In post-match interviews both Donovan and Beckham remained coy about their future MLS plans.

First to five league championships (2013–2016) 

Galaxy finished the 2013 season third in the Western Conference. They reached the conference semi-finals, where they lost 2–1 to Real Salt Lake. They also reached the semi-finals of the 2012–13 CONCACAF Champions League, but lost 3–1 on aggregate to Mexican team Monterrey.

Following the defeat to Seattle Sounders FC in the final game of the season with the Supporters' Shield on the line, the team entered the 2014 MLS playoffs defeating Real Salt Lake, advancing to face Seattle once again in the Western Conference Finals, advancing to the MLS Cup by away goals. They played the New England Revolution in the 2014 MLS Cup and won 2–1 in overtime, thereby becoming five-time champions, a league record. At the end of the season, longtime LA Galaxy and United States national team player Landon Donovan retired.

On January 7, 2015, the LA Galaxy announced the signing of long time Liverpool player Steven Gerrard to an 18-month Designated Player contract, reportedly worth $9 million. He joined the team in July 2015 following the end of the 2014–15 Premier League season, and made his debut in an International Champions Cup against Club América on July 11.

The club again made headlines by acquiring Mexican star and Barcelona academy product Giovani dos Santos in July as a designated player. Not since the days of Jorge Campos, Carlos Hermosillo and Luis Hernández in the late 1990s and early 2000s had the Galaxy had a notable Mexican player, let alone one in the prime of his career.  Dos Santos made an impactful impression on the Galaxy early on, scoring on his club debut against Central FC in the CONCACAF Champions League and then in his league debut against the Sounders. In his first five club matches, he had a goal, an assist or both to total with four goals and five assists in that span.

Wooden Spoon and rebuilding (2016–present) 
Before the start of the 2016 season, it was announced that long-time servicing center-back Omar Gonzalez would leave the Galaxy after nine years to C.F. Pachuca.

On November 22, 2016, long-time general manager and head coach Bruce Arena left the club to begin his second stint as head coach of the United States national team, bringing most of the Galaxy's coaching staff with him, including associate head coach Dave Sarachan. Arena was replaced as general manager by former Galaxy player Peter Vagenas, and as head coach by his LA Galaxy II counterpart, Curt Onalfo.

The front office constructed the team to rely on players from the academy and Galaxy II system. Multiple injuries exposed the naive roster construction, which included erratic performances by Jermaine Jones, and sparse production from Giovanni Dos Santos. With a 6–10–4 record, the Galaxy fired Curt Onalfo and replaced him with former head coach Sigi Schmid on July 27, 2017. Under Schmid, the club went 2–8–4 and finished the season in last place overall with a mark of 8–18–8. It was only the fourth time that the club failed to make the postseason, and the club's first wooden spoon.

In March 2018, the team signed Zlatan Ibrahimović on a two-year, $3 million contract with targeted allocation money. With the signing of Ibrahimović, the Galaxy's season would be seen promising. The Swede made his debut in the inaugural El Tráfico match against LAFC, scoring two goals to end the game with the Galaxy coming from 0–3 down to win 4–3. One of the goals Ibrahimović scored in that game later claimed MLS Goal of the Year. Los Angeles throughout the season had dealt with defensive struggles and on their last match of the regular season, against Houston Dynamo, the Galaxy were defeated and once again missed the postseason.

After the 2018 season, the Galaxy ended Ibrahimović's original deal and signed him to a new and higher salaried designated player contract. On March 1, 2019, the team announced they had exercised its one offseason Buyout of a Guaranteed Contract on Giovani dos Santos, thus releasing him from the team.

In the 2019 season, the Galaxy welcomed Guillermo Barros Schelotto to the club as head coach. The Galaxy also added a number of players, notably Uruguayan Diego Polenta, Argentine World Cup veteran Cristian Pavón, fellow Argentine Favio Álvarez and Mexican Uriel Antuna. With this, and the emergence of academy product Efraín Álvarez, the Galaxy placed fifth in the West and made the playoffs. The season was best remembered for Ibrahimović's performances against LAFC, including a hat-trick at home in July and a brace in Banc of California Stadium that August. Ibrahimović finished the season with 30 goals, the second-highest mark in the season and third-highest total in league history (with the record being broken by LAFC's Carlos Vela that year). In the playoffs, the Galaxy defeated Minnesota United 2–1 before falling to LAFC, 5–3. Ibrahimović left the club in November, and of the 2019 signings—most of them on loan—only Pavón returned for 2020. 

Three years later, in December 2022, MLS sanctioned the Galaxy for the 2019 Pavón signing, stripping the club of $1 million in allocation money and suspending club president Chris Klein. Moreover, the club was not allowed to sign international players in the 2023 summer transfer window.

The club arranged for a transfer from La Liga club Sevilla, signing a three-year contract with Javier "Chicharito" Hernandez on January 21, 2020, and making him the highest-paid player in the league. At the end of the season, after failing to making the postseason, head coach Guillermo Barros Schelotto was fired, and replaced with Dominic Kinnear as interim manager. On January 5, the Galaxy announced Greg Vanney as the new manager.

Under Vanney, the Galaxy narrowly missed the MLS playoffs in 2021, finishing eighth in the Western Conference (15th overall). In 2022, the club showed marked improvement, punctuated by the continued improvement of Hernández (who scored 18 goals) and the signings of former Barcelona youth product Riqui Puig and European veteran Gastón Brugman. The Galaxy finished fourth in the West (eighth overall), their highest mark since 2016, and beat Nashville SC at home in the first round of the MLS Cup playoffs before falling to their crosstown rivals LAFC in the conference semifinals, 3−2. Hernández was named the team's player of the year that season.

Colors and badge 

The LA Galaxy's current team colors are navy blue, gold, and white. The team's primary uniform is white and the secondary uniform is blue. The colors were adopted to coincide with David Beckham's arrival with the team in 2007 as part of an overall re-branding exercise spearheaded by then GM Alexi Lalas. Before 2007, the Galaxy played in various color combinations, usually comprising gold, teal green and white with black accents, and often highlighting an iconic sash design from the left shoulder and across the chest. Their original jersey, used in the inaugural 1996 MLS season, reflected the colors of the city of Los Angeles and featured black-and-teal halves, black sleeves with gold and red accents, black shorts and black socks.

The Galaxy have had two logos to date. The original brand was gold, teal and black, and featured the Galaxy wordmark superimposed over a golden swirl, with a stylized black outline. The logo was changed in 2007, again to coincide with David Beckham's arrival, and now features a blue shield with a gold border, the LA Galaxy team name, and a quasar at the top of the crest.

The quasar, featured prominently on the LA Galaxy's shield, was originally featured on the 1957 Seal of Los Angeles County, as well as the modified Seal of Los Angeles County, California.

The name "Galaxy" was created by Nike at the conception of the league; the apparel company was also the original uniform supplier for the team.

Revenues and profits 
The Galaxy first turned a profit in 2003, becoming the first MLS team to do so. After the team moved into the new Home Depot Center, the team saw increased attendance, a doubling of revenue from sponsors, and revenues from parking and concessions.

A Forbes 2015 report ranked the LA Galaxy second in MLS in terms of annual revenue ($44 million) and in franchise value ($240 million). The Galaxy earn more in annual club sponsorship income ($14 million) and annual local TV rights ($5 million) than any other MLS team. The Galaxy have the highest annual revenue of any MLS team, the third highest revenue of any CONCACAF team, and the seventh highest revenue of any team in the Americas.

Kit sponsors

Stadium 

From 1996 to 2002, the Galaxy played their home games at the 107,000-person capacity Rose Bowl in Pasadena, but often held U.S. Open Cup games at Titan Stadium on the campus of California State University, Fullerton. The Galaxy played 10 games in total at Titan Stadium; the U.S. Open Cup Final was held there in 2001 when the Galaxy won the tournament.

In 2003, the Galaxy moved to Dignity Health Sports Park (then known as the Home Depot Center, later known as StubHub Center), on the campus of California State University, Dominguez Hills in Carson, approximately ten miles south of downtown Los Angeles. The stadium is a 27,000-seat soccer-specific stadium, the second of its kind in MLS, but has hosted other sports such as rugby and American football. From 2005 to 2014, the Galaxy shared the stadium with their now-defunct league rivals Chivas USA, with whom they competed in the SuperClasico.

Club culture

Cozmo 

Cozmo is the Galaxy's mascot. He has dark blue skin with yellow eyebrows and white eyes matching the Galaxy's home uniform colors. He replaced the Galaxy's original mascot, "Twizzle", who also looked like it was from outer space but was more humanoid in form, wearing a space-man's helmet and cape.

Galaxy Star squad 
The Galaxy Star Squad is the official cheerleaders of the club. They often attend events hosted by the Galaxy, such as autograph sessions, and can be often seen around the stadium during game time giving away scarves and supporting the team.

Supporters 
The Angel City Brigade was created in 2007 to help establish a festive and vibrant atmosphere in Dignity Health Sports Park for the Galaxy. They were originally located in section 121 in the General Admission area of the stadium.

The LA Riot Squad formed after a loss in the 2001 MLS Cup, when then-Galaxy keeper Kevin Hartman challenged a group of Galaxy fans to form a supporter group of 100 people by opening day of 2002. The reward if they were able to do this was a keg of beer. They are located in sections 137 and 138 in the General Admission area of the stadium.

Galaxians are the first and original supporter group of the LA Galaxy, having been established in 1996 during the Galaxy's first season in MLS. They were originally located in section 124.

Galaxy Outlawz is the latest group started in 2019. They now join the Galaxians and the Angel City Brigade in the new safe standing section in the north end.

Victoria Block is the newest safe standing only section built in 2020 replacing all of the bleachers from sections 120 to 123 in the north end of the stadium. It is the new supporters only section and new home for the Galaxians, Angel City Brigade, and Galaxy Outlawz.

Ring of Honor

Rivalries 

The Galaxy's longest-running rivalry match is the California Clásico, played against the San Jose Earthquakes. It is considered among the fiercest and longest-running rivalries in American soccer. The intrastate rivalry dates to the founding of MLS, and their encounters in the MLS Cup playoffs and final. Some also cite that the rivalry developed in reflection of traditional Northern California—Southern California sports rivalries.

When Los Angeles FC (LAFC) joined the league in 2018 as an expansion team, a new crosstown rivalry was born. The Galaxy's current record vs LAFC, through 2022, is 7-5-5 (including 0-2 in the playoffs). Dubbed "El Tráfico", the rivalry has become one of the most passionate in the league.  By some measures, the Galaxy-LAFC rivalry is bigger than the Lakers-Clippers rivalry. 

From 2005 to 2014, the Galaxy were rivals with Chivas USA (now defunct), with whom they shared the same stadium, in the SuperClasico. This contest, with Chivas USA, was dominated by the Galaxy, who won 22 of the 34 encounters. The rivalry was the only intra-stadium rivalry in MLS until Chivas ceased operations at the end of the 2014 season.

Broadcasting 
From 2023, every Galaxy match is available via MLS Season Pass on the Apple TV app. Prior to this international all-streaming deal, the Galaxy appeared on a number of TV stations in the Southern California area throughout its first 27 years of existence.

At the end of the 2011 season, the Galaxy announced a ten-year, $55 million deal with Time Warner Cable (Now Charter Spectrum), the most lucrative local media contract in MLS history, to begin at the end of the 2012 MLS season. Previously, Galaxy matches were televised regionally in English on Fox Sports West or Prime Ticket. While awaiting the launch of those networks, all 2012 English-language matches were broadcast on local outlet KDOC, with one match showcased on Time Warner Cable SportsNet near the end of the season. In Spanish, 2012 matches were shown on independent outlet KWHY with Adrian Garcia Marquez and Francisco Pinto commentating. Television commentary is now handled by Joe Tutino and former Galaxy player Cobi Jones, and the radio stream is broadcast on the club's website.

Until they stopped broadcasting MLS in 2023, ESPN carried most games on its ESPN+ platform for out-of-market viewers, as well as showing nationally televised broadcasts on ESPN, ESPN2, or ABC. FOX Sports handles nationally televised broadcasts on Fox Sports 1, or the FOX. When Univisión broadcast a nationally televised game on its main network, UniMás, or TUDN, the match stream was also available on Twitter.

Players and staff 
 For details on former players, see All-time Los Angeles Galaxy roster.

Roster

Coaching staff

General managers

Head coaches

Youth development

LA Galaxy II 

The Galaxy created the LA Galaxy II reserve team in January 2014 to compete in the USL. In their inaugural season, Los Dos finished third with a record of 15–6–7, and reached the semi-final where they lost to Sacramento Republic FC.
For the 2015 USL season, the Galaxy were placed in the Western Conference.

Academy program 
As part of its development program, the Galaxy operates an academy system with U-18 and U-16 teams competing in the U.S. Soccer Development Academy, and U-14 and U-12 teams competing in Southern California Developmental Soccer Leagues (SCDSL). Recent academy graduates include: Jack McBean, Oscar Sorto, Jose Villarreal, Gyasi Zardes, Raul Mendiola Bradford Jamieson IV, and Efraín Álvarez.

Alliance clubs 
The LA Galaxy extended its youth development program and structure through the integration of existing youth clubs that have partnered under the LA Galaxy name. Known as the LA Galaxy Academy Alliance Clubs, they are located throughout Southern California, retain some autonomy and have access to LA Galaxy resources and outreach programs. One alliance club, LA Galaxy Orange County, has a men's category competing in the United Premier Soccer League.

Honors

Minor trophies 
MLS Fair Play Award: 2013

Retired numbers 
The LA Galaxy have not officially retired any jersey number. Former LA Galaxy player, Cobi Jones, was incorrectly believed to have had his jersey No. 13 retired until it was again issued in 2017 to Jermaine Jones.

Team results 

This is a partial list of the last five seasons completed by the Galaxy. For the full season-by-season history, see List of LA Galaxy seasons.

1. Avg. attendance include statistics from league matches only.
2. Top goalscorer(s) includes all goals scored in League, MLS Cup Playoffs, U.S. Open Cup, MLS is Back Tournament, CONCACAF Champions League, FIFA Club World Cup, and other competitive continental matches.

International tournaments

Player awards

Statistical records 
MLS regular season only, as of October 7, 2019
 Games:  Cobi Jones, 392
 Goals:  Landon Donovan, 113
 Assists:  Landon Donovan, 107
 Clean sheets:  Kevin Hartman, 64
 Goals in a season:  Zlatan Ibrahimović, 30 (2019)

Top goalscorers

Player of the Year

Golden Boot 
The Golden Boot winner is the leading goal scorer at the end of the season (only goals in MLS count). This award did not exist from 1996 to 2004. The MLS Scoring Champion Award included both goal and assist totals those years.

Defender of the Year

References

External links 

 

 
Anschutz Corporation
Association football clubs established in 1994
1994 establishments in California
Major League Soccer teams
U.S. Open Cup winners
CONCACAF Champions League winning clubs